Greenspring is a neighborhood in the North District of Baltimore, located between the neighborhoods of Woodberry (east) and Central Park Heights (west). Its boundaries are marked by West Cold Spring Lane (north), Greenspring Avenue (east), and Springhill Avenue (south). The western edge of the neighborhood runs along Pimlico Road from West Cold Spring Lane to Park Heights Avenue, then along Park Heights Avenue to Springhill Avenue.

Demographics
Greenspring's population is predominantly (97.5%) black. Median household income for the neighborhood was estimated at $26,828 for 2009, which was significantly less than the city median of $38,772.

Public transportation
Route 1 (MTA Maryland) provides bus service between Sinai Hospital (north) and Downtown Baltimore (south) along Greenspring Avenue.
Route 33 (MTA Maryland) runs from the Rogers Avenue Metro Station (west) to Moravia (east) along West Cold Spring Lane.
Route 54 (MTA Maryland) operates along Park Heights Avenue from the Penn-North Metro Station (east) and Randallstown (west).

References

External links 
North District Maps, Baltimore City Neighborhoods Portal

Neighborhoods in Baltimore
Northern Baltimore